A supra (Georgian: სუფრა ) is a traditional Georgian feast and a part of Georgian social culture. There are two types of supra: a festive supra (ლხინის სუფრა), called a keipi; and a sombre supra (ჭირის სუფრა), called a kelekhi, which is always held after burials.

The traditions of supra, as an important part of Georgian social culture, were inscribed on the Intangible Cultural Heritage of Georgia list in 2017. Traditionally, and for many Georgians, up to the present, the foregrounded participants at a supra are men, with women relegated to secondary, supporting roles (especially as far as food preparation is concerned).

Etymology 
In Georgian, "supra" literally means "table-cloth" and, over centuries, it has become essentially synonymous with feasts where a large table is ordinarily set. The word for "table-cloth" itself is likely related to the Persian word sofre, although it does not have the same connotations outside of the Georgian language context. Large public meals are never held in Georgia without a supra; when there are no tables, the supra is laid on the ground.

Rules

Regardless of size and type, a supra is always led by a tamada, or toastmaster, who introduces each toast during the feast.  The tamada is elected by the banqueting guests or chosen by the host.  A successful tamada must possess great rhetorical skill and be able to consume a large amount of alcohol without showing signs of drunkenness.

During the meal, the tamada will propose a toast, and then speak at some length about the topic. The guests raise their glasses, but do not drink. After the tamada has spoken, the toast continues, often in a generally counter-clockwise direction (to the right). The next guest who wishes to speak raises their glass, holds forth, and then drains their glass. If a guest does not wish to speak, they may drink from their glass after some words that particularly resonate to them. 

Eating is entirely appropriate during toasts, but talking is frowned upon. Once everyone who wishes to speak on the theme has done so, the tamada proposes a new toast, and the cycle begins again. Some popular traditional themes include toasts to God, Georgia, family, the mother of God, various saints, friends, ancestors, and so on. However, the theme of each toast is up to the tamada, who should be able to tailor his or her toasts to the occasion.

A keipi toast is called sadghegrdzelo (სადღეგრძელო), while a kelekhi toast is called a shesandobari (შესანდობარი).

See also
 List of dining events

References

External links 

 Darra Goldstein, The Georgian Feast': The Vibrant Culture and Savory Food of the Republic of Georgia, 1999, 
 The Autocrat of the Banquet Table
 About Georgia

Culture of Georgia (country)
Georgian words and phrases
Eating parties